The California Association of Student Councils (CASC) is a non-profit, student-led youth leadership and advocacy organization. Founded in 1947 by the California Department of Education and now-Association of California School Administrators, CASC has provided a multitude of conferences to students, advisors, and professionals in both California and around the world.

Overview 
The California Association of Student Councils is a youth training/mentoring organization that also lobbies for youth-oriented legislation. It runs over sixty student leadership training events a year training students from elementary, middle, and high school students in leadership and team-building skills. All trainings are peer-to-peer, and thus all directors and counselors at the conferences are students.

In addition to leadership trainings, CASC serves as an advocate for youth in Sacramento, lobbying continuously through the year. CASC holds two conferences each year at which students create formal proposals to the California State Board of Education and California State Senate or California State Assembly Education Committees.

CASC programs are hands-on experiences that demonstrate the power of peer-to-peer teaching, with students as mentors and instructors. CASC works toward the principles on which it was founded in 1947: “to give students actual experiences and involvement in decision making and democratic experiences.” Their student officers, trainers and alumni are consistently recognized for their professionalism, competence, and adaptability.

Mission
“The mission of the California Association of Student Councils is to provide leadership development for elementary, middle, and high school students and their advisors in California and across the world through peer training. Our programs emphasize authenticity, ethics, and collaborative decision-making which enhance learning outside of the classroom by fostering self-esteem and civic engagement. CASC advocates for the youth, provides an avenue for the expression on student views and empowers young people."

Purpose
"The purpose of the California Association of Student Councils is to improve the quality of life in the world by developing skilled, ethical and sensitive leaders of diverse backgrounds and cultures."

Structure

State Council
The State Council consists of 24 California high school students that are appointed in the spring of each year to serve a one-year term. The student council is divided into two branches known as the Executive Cabinet and State Cabinet. Each member retains full voting rights and is primarily responsible for: promoting membership, developing annual plans, organizing and approving conferences/programs, setting program policies, proposing/approving structural changes, approving management training, and developing long-term plans.

Regions
Each region has its respective president who appoints a cabinet composed of students (grades 9-12) from that region. The positions on each cabinet, include but are not limited to:
 Vice President
 Secretary/Treasurer
 Government Affairs and Programs Director
 Government Affairs and Programs Committee Member
 Development Director
 Development Committee Member
 Outreach Director
 Outreach Committee Member

Board of Directors
The Board of Directors is composed of ten adults, and five students elected by the State Council. Two of the students, in the Secretary/Treasurer and Development positions, are voted onto the board immediately upon a vote by members of State Council. All members of the board share equal permissions and responsibilities.

CASC Programs

Summer Leadership Conferences 
 High School
 Middle School
CASC summer leadership conferences bring together students and advisors at a multi-day training conference held at University of California, Santa Barbara. In the past, summer conferences have been conducted at college campuses such as the University of California, Berkeley, Stanford University, and Saint Mary's College of California. All of the curriculum is taught through hands-on activities in small groups led by high school and college students. Skills are taught in areas including.
 personal goal setting and time management
 project planning in a team setting
 working collaboratively and resolving conflicts
 presentation skills
 facilitative leadership and meeting skills

One-Day Leadership Workshops
 High School
 Middle School
 Elementary School
One-day workshops throughout the state focus on individual and group skill development. Working with trained high school and college students who serve as role models, students meet in small groups with peers from other local schools to practice meeting and presentation skills and to engage in collaborative problem solving exercises.

Staff Development Program
Students (sophomores and older) who have successfully completed the CASC basic high school summer leadership program become eligible to attend a three-day staff development program. Upon completing the training they may be recommended to serve as a trainer at any CASC conference. Additionally, selected college-age CASC trainers are invited to attend Advanced Skills Training. Trainers of trainers and international staff are selected from this group.

ASB Advisor Workshop
This two-day workshop focuses on the role of a Student Council/ASB, structure, selection and training of members, team-building techniques, evaluation of performance, coaching and feedback. Participants have an opportunity to share best practices as well as address current challenges.

Leadership Educators Workshop
This two-day program is focused on curriculum for training current and aspiring student leaders.
Topics covered include: units of study, principles of design, integration of lessons with event planning, and grading. Participants develop skills in meeting planning and management, situational leadership, team development, and project planning. Time is allocated for exploring resources.

Student Advisory Board on Education (SABE)
At this multi day conference, students from all over the state learn about education policy and have an opportunity to influence it. The SABE conference has been held annually since 1966. SABE proposals are presented to the State Board of Education. SABE is run by the Education Policy Director

Additionally, delegates at the SABE conference elect the top six of twelve candidates for the student position on the State Board of Education. These six are then sent to the State Board to be narrowed down the top three.

Student Advisory Board on Legislation in Education (SABLE)
High school and middle school students throughout California gather in Sacramento to discuss educational issues of common concern and prepare proposals for the Assembly Education Committee and the Senate Education Committee. SABLE is run by the Education Policy Director.

Youth Action Summit of California (YASC)
Held during the school year, this multi-day conference for high school and middle school students attracts participants throughout the state. Participants are trained in skills including project planning, meeting skills, resolving conflict, lobbying, collaborating with adults, attracting media attention and surveying student opinion. Opportunities for action at school and in the community are explored in elective workshops. YASC is run by the YASC Director on the State Council

Student Board Member Symposiums
These one-day interactive workshops bring together serving and aspiring student board members together with adult board members and consultants. The program focuses on training in areas necessary for these students to serve effectively, including responsibilities and roles, best practices and techniques for surveying students.

Student Accreditor Program
In cooperation with the Western Association of Schools and Colleges, CASC selects students to be members of school accreditation teams.

Custom Designed Programs
CASC designs full school leadership and personal development programs, differentiated instruction opportunities, conflict management training, meeting skills, workshops and team building for individual student councils, schools, districts, departments, and organizations. Custom Designed Programs are called Special Projects, and are run by the Special Projects Director.

CASC 2020
CASC 2020 is CASC’s vision for the ideal state of education in California by the year 2020. This program rests on four main goals:
 Student Board Members on every School Board
 Student evaluation of teachers
 Awareness of Student rights and responsibilities
 Development of effective student councils
With these four goals, CASC has created benchmarks and guidelines for schools to work to accomplish these goals.

Accomplishments
(Taken from literature published by the California Association of Student Councils)

Schools
 In 1996 CASC facilitated establishment of the Westside Leadership Magnet School in the Los Angeles Unified School District. Currently, student leaders conduct classroom lessons in leadership three times a week for primary and elementary students.
 CASC trains peer mentors for the summer enrichment program for “at-risk” entering ninth graders in the Compass Program at Menlo-Atherton High School. The program serves as a catalyst for the development of class, club, and ASB leaders.
 CASC designed special workshops for Gifted and Talented students in the Mountain-View Whisman Elementary District and the Mt. Diablo School Distrist.
 Over a four-year period, CASC conducted training for classes, the staff, and the entire student body at Menlo-Atherton High School. The result was a more unified and respectful student population.
 Each year, CASC runs a school-wide team development workshop at Hillview Middle School for the entire eighth grade class.

Organization
 CASC provided small group facilitators for the Educational Planning Forum for the Sequoia Union High School District. Meeting skills training was also provided for parent groups.
 CASC designed leadership lessons and trained staff for Sacramento START that conducts after-school programs in 40 low-income elementary schools.
 CASC designed a project planning and personal development program for students enrolled in the Jefferson Awards program in the Bay Area.

National
 CASC leaders served as facilitators and recorders for small group sessions at the 2002 Family Re-Union Conference sponsored by Al and Tipper Gore at Vanderbilt University.
 The Executive Director is serving as the “architect for leadership development” for the American Society of Plastic Surgeons. CASC Trainers are currently working with the staff, board, and members to augment their leadership skills.
 in 1995, the Corporation for National Service selected CASC as one of three organizations to collaborate in designing and conducting training for the national service executives.
 CASC youth leaders staffed the 1992 Earth Train project and conducted environmental forums in Los Angeles, Denver, and Chicago and met with United Nations and Congressional leaders.

International
 In 1987 CASC student leaders worked with Russian and Finnish counterparts to develop and Agenda for the 21st Century. The document was presented directly to Presidents Mikhail Gorbachev and Ronald Reagan and led to the first youth exchange program between the U.S. and Soviet Union.
 CASC training and support led to the founding of the Association of Young Leaders (AYL), the third non-profit organization formed in the newly independent former Soviet states in 1992.
 CASC youth staffed three Global Youth Conferences at the 1992 Earth Summit and the 1995 and 1996 State of the World Forums.
 In 2004 CASC and AYL staff trained Japanese youth to serve as facilitators for an environmental forum in Aomori, Japan.

Honors
 Selected as a model self-esteem program by the California Task force on Self-Esteem.
 Selected as a model youth program by the International Youth Foundation.
 Selected as Top-Rated Nonprofit of 2010 by Great Nonprofits.

See also
 California State Student Association
 Student Senate for California Community Colleges
 University of California Students Association

References

External links
 
 Facebook
 Twitter

Youth organizations based in California
Political organizations based in the United States
Youth model government
Organizations based in Oakland, California
Non-profit organizations based in the San Francisco Bay Area
Student organizations in California
1947 establishments in California